Sajjad Behrouzi (born 20 September 1989) is an Iranian weightlifter who won the Bronze medal in the Men's 69 kg weight class at the 2012 Asian Weightlifting Championships. In 2006 he was banned from competing for two years for doping.

Major results

References

External links
 
 

1989 births
Living people
Iranian male weightlifters
Iranian strength athletes
Iranian sportspeople in doping cases
21st-century Iranian people